The 1967 County Championship was the 68th officially organised running of the County Championship. Yorkshire won their second consecutive Championship title.

The method of obtaining points changed again for a second successive year: 
 8 points for a win
 4 points for a tie
 4 points for a team batting first in a drawn match with scores level
 4 points for a first innings lead
 2 points for a tie on first innings
 2 points for draw providing there is a first innings result
 One day rules scrapped

Table

References

1967 in English cricket
County Championship seasons